A. cearensis may refer to:

 Acianthera cearensis, a neotropical orchid
 Amburana cearensis, a timber tree
 Annona cearensis, a custard-apple tree